Brevi is an Italian surname. Notable people with the surname include:

Ezio Brevi (born 1970), Italian footballer and manager
Giovanni Battista Brevi, Italian Baroque composer
Oscar Brevi (born 1967), Italian footballer and manager

See also
Brevis (disambiguation)

Italian-language surnames